Rodney Allen Filer (born June 14, 1974) is a retired arena football fullback who played in the Arena Football League (AFL) for thirteen seasons. Filer played college football for the University of Iowa. He was signed as an undrafted free agent by the San Diego Chargers of the National Football League (NFL) in 1997. A one-time All-Arena selection, he was a member of the Iowa Barnstormers, New York Dragons, Las Vegas Gladiators, Tampa Bay Storm and Utah Blaze.

Career rushing statistics

Career receiving statistics

References

External links
 ArenaFan page
 AFL Retirement announcement

1974 births
Living people
American football running backs
Iowa Hawkeyes football players
Iowa Barnstormers players
New York Dragons players
Las Vegas Gladiators players
Tampa Bay Storm players
Utah Blaze players
Iowa Barnstormers coaches